Virgin Trains (legal name West Coast Trains Limited) was a train operating company in the United Kingdom owned by Virgin Rail Group, a joint venture between Virgin Group and Stagecoach, which operated the InterCity West Coast franchise from 9 March 1997 to 7 December 2019. The franchise covered long-distance passenger services on the West Coast Main Line between London, the West Midlands, North West England, North Wales and Scotland, consequently connecting six of the UK's largest cities: London, Birmingham, Liverpool, Manchester, Glasgow and Edinburgh, which have a combined metropolitan population of over 18 million.  Virgin Trains had around 3,400 employees in 2015.

The Virgin Trains brand was also used on the legally and operationally separate Virgin Trains East Coast from 2015 until 2018, and previously on Virgin CrossCountry, which operated between 1997 and 2007, as well as from 2018 to 2020 by Virgin Trains USA in Florida.

The contract expired on 7 December 2019 (having been originally scheduled for expiry in March 2020) and Virgin did not contest losing the franchise after its joint venture partner, Stagecoach, was disqualified due to an invalid bid in April 2019.

History

Virgin Rail Group was awarded the InterCity West Coast franchise in January 1997, beating Sea Containers and Stagecoach, with operations commencing on 9 March 1997. In October 1998 Virgin Group sold 49% of the shares in Virgin Rail Group to Stagecoach.

When Virgin won the franchise, Railtrack was to upgrade the West Coast Main Line to allow tilting trains to operate at 140 mph by 2005. In the wake of the collapse of Railtrack and the inability of Network Rail to deliver on the 140 mph West Coast Main Line upgrade, both the Virgin CrossCountry and Virgin Trains West Coast franchises were suspended in favour of management contracts in July 2002. Due to costs having blown out from £2.5 billion to £10 billion there were cutbacks to the upgrade, and the top speed was reduced to 125 mph.

Virgin Trains' franchise was due to expire in March 2012. In 2009 Richard Branson launched a campaign to have the next franchise period extended for 20 to 30 years, so that Virgin could spend more on infrastructure and see a return on its investment. Branson said the journey time between London and Birmingham could be reduced by 22 minutes to under one hour. This was turned down by the Department for Transport. Virgin had applied for a two-year extension, but this was ruled out by the Department of Transport on legal grounds.

In January 2011 the Department for Transport called for expressions of interest in bidding for the next InterCity West Coast franchise. In March 2011 the Department announced that Abellio, FirstGroup, Keolis/SNCF and Virgin Rail Group had been shortlisted to bid for the franchise. In May 2011 the Secretary of State for Transport announced that the end date had been postponed to allow the recommendations in the McNulty Report to be absorbed. In October 2011 the Department announced that Virgin had been granted a franchise extension until December 2012.

An Invitation to tender was issued to the shortlisted bidders in January 2012, and the Department for Transport awarded FirstGroup the new franchise in August 2012.

In October 2012 the Secretary of State announced that the government was cancelling the franchise competition for the InterCity West Coast franchise after discovering significant technical flaws in the way the franchise process was conducted, reversing the decision to award it to FirstGroup. Following an independent review of the franchising process, a fresh competition would be held. The government announced that it would negotiate with Virgin Trains to run the InterCity West Coast franchise for a further 9 to 13 months. In December 2012 Virgin was awarded a 23-month management contract to run the franchise until 9 November 2014.

In March 2013 the Secretary of State announced that the franchise would again be extended until 31 March 2017.

In July 2013 the Office of Rail Regulation rejected an application by Virgin Trains to operate new services to Shrewsbury and Blackpool North, citing capacity constraints on the West Coast Main Line. In November 2013 a revised application for services to Shrewsbury and Blackpool North was approved, and the services started in December 2014.

In November 2016, the franchise was further extended until March 2019.

In February 2018 the contract was extended until March 2019, with an option to extend it further to March 2020. However, in March 2018 it was announced that the contract would end in September 2019 when the new West Coast Partnership franchise would commence.

In December 2018, it was announced that Virgin Trains had been granted a one-year extension until March 2020.

In August 2019 it was announced that the Inter-City West Coast franchise had been awarded to Avanti West Coast, thus confirming that Virgin Trains would cease to operate trains after 7 December 2019. The final Virgin Trains service was the 21:42 service from London Euston to Wolverhampton arriving at 23:45.

Services

In May 1998 Virgin introduced two new services from London Euston, to Shrewsbury and to Blackpool North. The former ceased in 1999, the latter in May 2003. In December 2014, a daily weekday service between London Euston and Blackpool North and a twice daily service between London Euston and Shrewsbury were reintroduced. This was increased to 4 trains per day in the May 2018 timetable.

In September 2004, a London Euston to Llandudno service was introduced, but it ceased in December 2008.

In September 2005, Virgin introduced its first  timetable following the completion of Stage 1 of the upgrade.

In December 2007, as part of a reshuffle of rail franchises by the Department for Transport, services from Birmingham New Street to Edinburgh Waverley and Glasgow Central via Crewe were transferred from the CrossCountry franchise to the InterCity West Coast franchise.

In December 2008, a Wrexham General to London Euston service was introduced, operating south in the morning with an evening return.

In February 2009, an hourly London Euston to Chester service was introduced.

From January 2009, Virgin Trains gradually rolled out a new "very high frequency" timetable to take advantage of the completed West Coast Main Line upgrade.

There were timetable changes from 8 December 2013. Trains between Edinburgh/Glasgow and London services would call at Sandwell & Dudley, replacing the hourly Wolverhampton to Euston service. In addition most Liverpool services additionally called at Crewe.

Performance

Passenger numbers

Punctuality
Virgin Trains suffered poor punctuality compared with some other transport operators between 2001 and 2006, according to Office of Rail Regulation statistics. Punctuality did gradually improve until the introduction of a new timetable (in December 2008), following the upgrade of the West Coast Main Line, which resulted in a dip in performance. Performance subsequently recovered and peaked during 2010–11, but then fell again and reached a new low for the year ending 31 March 2013 of 83.6% (MAA).

The PPM MAA (Public Performance Measure Moving Annual Average - % of trains arriving within 10 minutes of the scheduled times) figures for Virgin Trains are as follows:

Latest figures published by Network Rail for the seventh period of 2013-2014 recorded PPM of 92.2% for the period and a MAA of 83.5% for the 12 months up to 12 October 2013. The PPM performance for the period is down 2.7 percentage points on the corresponding figure from the same period last year. Network Rail noted that Virgin Trains were only responsible for 16% of delays in period 5. Network Rail was itself directly responsible for 50% of Virgin Trains' delays, 20% were a result of external factors (e.g. fatalities) and the final 14% were due to other operators.

Chris Green as chief executive led a drive to improve reliability and punctuality after much press criticism in 2001, and by 2006, due to improved reliability of trains and completion of major infrastructure projects, performance was better. Virgin has undertaken a number of projects to increase punctuality, including radio-controlled watches.

Grayrigg derailment

On 23 February 2007 a Class 390 Pendolino "City of Glasgow" forming the 17:15 London Euston to Glasgow Central service derailed in the village of Grayrigg in Cumbria. The train was carrying 109 people. Several carriages were left lying on the railway embankments. An elderly woman was killed in the derailment. Five people were seriously injured. The accident was caused by a faulty set of points and Network Rail accepted full responsibility. The train itself however was widely praised for the way it retained its structural integrity. Richard Branson also praised the train driver because he attempted to stop the train and did not get out of the cab before it derailed.

Rolling stock

Fleet at end of franchise

A franchise commitment was the replacement of these trains with new tilting stock. In 1999 Virgin signed a deal to lease forty-four eight-carriage and nine nine-carriage Class 390 Pendolinos built by Alstom. An option to extend all to nine carriages was enacted in 2002. The first entered service in January 2003. With the exception of services to Holyhead, the final locomotive hauled trains were withdrawn in June 2005.

To operate the Holyhead services four four-carriage Class 221 Super Voyagers were included in the order placed by Virgin CrossCountry. By the time they were delivered it was decided these would be too short so they entered service with Virgin CrossCountry. From September 2005 Class 57/3s hauling Class 390 Pendolinos took over the locomotive hauled diagrams. This continued until December 2008 when five-carriage Class 221 Super Voyagers took over all services, with the exception of a Saturdays only Pendolino hauled by a Class 57/3 Locomotive (1D83 08:50 EUS-HHD/1A55 14:38 HHD-EUS). This ceased operation on Saturday 8 December 2012.

With the Class 390 Pendolinos needing modification in 2006, a First GBRf  was hired to haul a Mark 3 set on Birmingham New Street services.

To operate the Birmingham to Edinburgh and Glasgow services transferred from CrossCountry in December 2007, three four-carriage and thirteen five-carriage Class 221 Super Voyagers were transferred. A further five five-carriage Class 221 Super Voyagers followed in December 2008.

In August 2008 Bombardier started a programme to rearrange the Class 221 Super Voyagers with the carriage containing the shop moved to adjoin the first class carriage and refurbished with 2+2 seats arranged more spaciously around tables. This allowed it to be used as a first class carriage on Holyhead services and as a standard class carriage at other times.

In December 2010 one four-carriage Class 221 Super Voyager was disbanded with the two centre carriages being inserted into the other four-carriage sets to give Virgin a fleet of twenty five-carriage Class 221 Super Voyagers. The two end carriages are stored at Central Rivers depot.

To provide it with a fleet of locomotives for use on diversionary services during the West Coast Mainline upgrade and rescue duties, Virgin signed a deal with Porterbrook in March 2002 to rebuild twelve Class 47s as Class 57/3s with the first delivered in June 2002. After it was decided they would operate daily services along the North Wales Coast to Holyhead, another four were ordered from Porterbrook. Following the completion of the West Coast Main Line upgrade in 2008 their use fell and after being sublet to Arriva Trains Wales, Colas Rail and First GBRf, six were returned to Porterbrook in August 2011, three in April 2012 and the remaining seven in December 2012.

Virgin had long been angling for a franchise extension in return for ordering extra carriages for the Class 390 Pendolinos. The Department for Transport rejected this and instead placed an order itself with Alstom for 106 carriages allowing for four complete eleven-carriage sets and 31 sets to be extended by two carriages. There was an option to extend the remaining 21 sets but this was allowed to lapse. The four new sets were delivered in 2010/12 with 31 sets later receiving extra carriages. This required a number of stations to have platforms lengthened.

Following the loss of a Class 390 Pendolino in the Grayrigg derailment, a Mark 3 set with a Driving Van Trailer was leased with a  hired from English Welsh & Scottish as required. In 2008 Virgin looked at leasing two  but decided to retain the Mark 3 set. Nicknamed the Pretendolino, this received re-upholstered seating, power points, Wi-Fi and a full external re-paint at Wabtec, Doncaster in 2009. Virgin used this set with a Class 90 locomotive hired from Freightliner on a Euston to Crewe (via Birmingham) service on Fridays only until December 2012. From 9 December 2013 it was utilised to operate a London Euston-Birmingham New Street train on Thursdays and Fridays only, until its withdrawal in October 2014.

All seats on Class 221 Super Voyagers and Class 390 Pendolinos originally had an on-board audio entertainment system featuring a number of radio or pre-recorded music channels. This was disabled in March 2010 and replaced with on-board Wi-Fi provided by EE. The service was available free in first class, and for a charge (which varied depending on how long the passenger wished to use it for) in standard class.

On 15 September 2015 it was announced that Virgin Trains were to rename Pendolino 390002 in memory of teenage fundraiser Stephen Sutton.

Past fleet
Former units operated by Virgin Trains include:

Depots
The Class 390 fleet was allocated to the Alstom Traincare Centre at Longsight with lighter maintenance and overnight servicing carried out at Wembley, Oxley, Edge Hill and Polmadie depots. The Class 221 fleet was allocated to Bombardier's Central Rivers depot with lighter maintenance and overnight servicing carried out at Arriva TrainCare, Crewe, Holyhead and Polmadie.

West Coast Partnership
In November 2016, the government announced that the franchise would be replaced by a new franchise named the West Coast Partnership, which will include operating High Speed 2 (HS2). Services are planned to begin on the first phase of HS2 in 2026. The Department for Transport requires that the new operator have experience in operating high-speed trains and infrastructure. The bid for the new franchise was led by Stagecoach holding a 50% holding, Virgin with 30% and the French national railway operator SNCF holding 20%. In April 2019 Stagecoach revealed that it had been disqualified from the franchises it was bidding for following a dispute with the DfT over pension liabilities. The disqualification occurred after the bidding deadline and as a result Virgin Trains would cease operations in March 2020.

In August 2019, the First Trenitalia consortium was awarded the West Coast Partnership contract, with Avanti West Coast commencing in December 2019, thus ending Virgin Trains services after 22 years.

Operation

Sponsorship
Virgin Trains were Carlisle United F.C.'s travel sponsor for the 2013–14 season, and for the 2014–15 season they are the club's main shirt sponsor agreeing a further two-year deal. On 5 August 2014 Virgin Trains also agreed to be the shirt sponsor of Preston North End F.C. on a two-year deal. Darlington Football Club were also sponsored by Virgin Trains, and the company has also sponsored events such as Manchester International Festival in 2013.

Onboard entertainment
In July 2016 the integrated infotainment system BEAM was provided on all trains by GoMedia, delivered directly to the passenger's own devices including mobile phones and tablets. The system has been described as 'the first in-train entertainment portal in the UK'. It offered premium movies from Hollywood studios, BBC Worldwide etc.

Moderation of competition
As a way of protecting the revenues of Virgin Trains to enable it to pay franchise premiums to the government to partly recoup the cost of the West Coast Main Line upgrade, the Office of Rail Regulation inserted a Moderation of Competition in Virgin's Track Access Agreement. Until its expiry in March 2012, this prevented any other train operating or open access companies operating services in competition that would abstract revenue.

Attempts to continue franchise 
In November 2019, Virgin Trains submitted an application to the Office of Rail and Road (ORR) to apply for a license to run trains from Liverpool Lime Street to London Euston. The application stated the intention to use Class 221 Super Voyager trains (once they were retired by Avanti West Coast) with the franchise beginning in December 2022 initially until December 2027. However, in March 2020, Virgin withdrew its application for the service, citing uncertainty from the Williams Review of rail not having been published yet.

See also
List of companies operating trains in the United Kingdom
National Rail
Rail franchising in Great Britain
Rail transport in Great Britain

References

Further reading

External links
Official website, archived in December 2019

 
Defunct train operating companies
Railway companies established in 1997
Railway companies disestablished in 2019
Stagecoach Group rail services
British companies established in 1997
British companies disestablished in 2019